Sidney Community School District, or Sidney Community Schools,  is a public school district headquartered in Sidney, Iowa. It serves Sidney and Riverton.

It operates Sidney Elementary School and Sidney Junior-Senior High School.

, the district had 455 students, including 140 senior high school students.

The Farragut Community School District was dissolved effective July 1, 2016. Most of the Farragut district west of County Road M-16, including Riverton, was assigned to Sidney CSD.

It is one of several school districts that accepts high school students from the K-8 Hamburg Community School District of Hamburg.

Schools
The district operates two schools on two campuses in Sidney, and a Virtual SAC School:
Sidney Elementary School
Sidney High School

Sidney High School

Athletics
The Cowboys & Cowgirls compete in the Corner Conference in the following sports:

Cross Country (boys and girls)
Volleyball 
 2019 State Champions
Football 
Basketball (boys and girls)
Wrestling 
Track and Field (boys and girls)
 1984 State Champions (boys)
Golf (boys and girls)
Baseball 
Softball

See also
List of school districts in Iowa
List of high schools in Iowa

References

External links
Sidney Community School District
 

School districts in Iowa
Fremont County, Iowa